Bartkowski (feminine: Bartkowska , plural: Bartkowscy), a Polish-language surname, may refer to

People with the surname
 (born 1943), Polish jazz musician; see Enigmatic (album)
Jakub Bartkowski (born 1991), Polish footballer
Matt Bartkowski (born 1988), American ice hockey player
Steve Bartkowski (born 1952), American football player

Other uses
 Nick Bartkowski, a character from the 1999 film Disorganized Crime
Bartkowski Dwór, a settlement in Poland

See also
 

Polish-language surnames